Don Reo is an American television writer and producer. He created or co-created such shows as Blossom and The John Larroquette Show for NBC,  My Wife and Kids for ABC and The Ranch for Netflix.

Other shows for which he has written include Wizards and Warriors, Everybody Hates Chris, M*A*S*H, Rhoda and The Golden Girls. He was also the executive producer and the main writer for the FOX show Action.  He created the FOX show Brothers and later was an executive producer and showrunner on Two and a Half Men with Jim Patterson.

Reo co-wrote the book Big Man with Clarence Clemons.

References

External links

Living people
American television writers
American male television writers
American television producers
Writers from Rhode Island
1946 births
Screenwriters from Rhode Island